Bulgan Airport, Khovd  serves the city of Bulgan, in the Khovd Province of Mongolia. It has a grass runway 17/35 .

See also 
List of airports in Mongolia

Airports in Mongolia